Eupatoriopsis is a genus of flowering plants in the family Asteraceae.

There is only one known species, Eupatoriopsis hoffmanniana, endemic to the State of Minas Gerais in Brazil.

References

Eupatorieae
Monotypic Asteraceae genera
Endemic flora of Brazil